Portales is a station on Line 2 of the Mexico City Metro system. It is located in the Colonia Albert and Colonia Portales neighborhoods of the Benito Juárez borough of Mexico City, directly south of the city centre in the median of Calzada de Tlalpan. It is a surface station.

General information
The station logo depicts an architectural portal. In the early 20th century there were many ranches in the surrounding zone, which were later divided up by Emiliano Zapata as part of his land redistribution plans. The area later became famous for the manufacture of bricks for the construction area.  The station opened on 1 August 1970.

Portales provides a transfer to trolleybus Line "D", which runs between Metro Mixcoac and the San Andrés Tetepilco neighbourhood.

Ridership

Exits
East: Calzada de Tlalpan between Av. Victor Hugo and Hamburgo street, Colonia Albert
West: Calzada de Tlalpan between Av. Victor Hugo and Calzada Santa Cruz, Colonia Portales

See also 
 List of Mexico City metro stations

References

External links 

Portales
Railway stations opened in 1970
1970 establishments in Mexico
Mexico City Metro stations in Benito Juárez, Mexico City
Accessible Mexico City Metro stations